Parma Township may refer to the following townships in the United States:

 Parma Township, Michigan, in Jackson County
 Parma Township, Cuyahoga County, Ohio, defunct township

See also 
 Parma Township, New York, town in Monroe County